Router may refer to:

 Router (computing), a computer networking device
 Router (woodworking), a rotating cutting tool
Router plane, a woodworking hand plane

See also
 Rooter (disambiguation)
 Route (disambiguation)
 Routing (disambiguation)